The Celestial Church of Christ (CCC) is a church founded in Africa by Samuel Oshoffa on 29 September 1947 in Porto-Novo, Benin. It is located in most countries worldwide including the United States and various countries in Africa.

History
Oshoffa was a former carpenter born in Dahomey (now Benin) in 1909. Raised as a Methodist, he had a divine revelation while lost in a forest on 23 May 1947 during a solar eclipse. (The nearest recorded solar eclipse visible in Africa occurred on May 20, not May 23, of that year.) He felt called to pray, to heal the sick, and to raise the dead. He founded his church in September 1947. Having appointed himself Prophet, Reverend, Pastor, and Founder, he occupied the highest office of his movement. The hegemony he exercised on doctrine and discipline issues made succession difficult when he died in 1985 in Lagos, Nigeria.

The CCC was recognized and authorized by the Republic of Dahomey in 1965. From 1976, the church launched an evangelistic campaign in that country, a former colony of French West Africa, which had become independent in 1960. From the late 1990s, the CCC church has utilized the internet as a means of evangelization, thus allowing the many existing branches of the church within the African diaspora in such nations as the United Kingdom, Germany, Austria, France and the United States, to maintain contact with each other and with Nigeria, the nation in which the CCC is currently most popular.

The movement has continued to grow since Oshoffa's death, but has also suffered setbacks, the most immediate being severe difficulties related to the matter of succession. Oshoffa was succeeded by Alexander Abiodun Adebayo Bada, who was head of the church until his death on 8 September 2000.
Bada was briefly followed as leader by Philip Hunsu Ajose, who died in March 2001. A dispute followed over the succession to Ajose. Some declared Gilbert Oluwatosin Jesse as the new leader, while the majority recognised the Reverend Emmanuel Oshoffa, son of Samuel Oshoffa.
Following Jesse's death, his faction declared that Superior Evangelist Paul Suru Maforikan was the new spiritual leader of the church. Contrary to the procedure of succession in Nigeria, Porto-Novo, the supreme headquarters,  successfully chose Benoit Agbaossi (1931–2010) to be the head of the church, who in his turn appointed Benoit Adeogun as the next Rev. Pastor shortly before his death in 2010.

Beliefs
The CCC is a prophetic one with a Christian background. The faithful are called Celestians, and the church is sometimes informally called “Cele”. The formal name of the church is inspired by a vision by which Jesus would have said that Church members adore him as do the angels in heaven. The name of the church comes from Deuteronomy 26:15: "Look down from thy Holy habitation, from heaven, and bless thy people Israel and the land which thou hast given us, as thou didst swear to our father, a land flowing with milk and honey". The name signifies that they deem themselves as celestial or a representative of the heavenly on Earth. The church claims inspiration from God through the manifestation of the Holy Spirit among the faithful. Its doctrinal teachings are based on the Bible, and any superstition or animist belief from traditional African religions is excluded, as in other churches in the Aladura movement.

The church is governed by twelve major recommendations, consisting of several prohibitions, including food, common to a number of other monotheistic religions. Tobacco, alcohol and the eating of pork are forbidden. The faithful must not wear their shoes whilst wearing their garments and within the main church. Men and women are separated at the church. Menstruating women and those who have recently given birth are unclean and cannot enter the church building or wear the garment for seven days in the first case after which they would be "sanctified". Members of CCC are forbidden to engage or participate in any form of idolatory, fetish ceremony or cults, black magic and charms. Only men who are "anointed" are allowed access to the altar.

The church uses English language Bibles and the Yoruba translated versions. The church supposedly takes elements from Gungbe and Yoruba thought. It also has strong similarities to the "purification movements" against paganism that are relatively common in African Christianity. Oshoffa believed he had a mission to combat "[Satan], 'fetish priests' and other 'powers of darkness'."(Marburg colloquy)

Imeko Convocation
Every December (usually, between the 21st and 24th) the church hosts an international event called the Imeko Convocation. It is mandated that every member of CCC attends as a pilgrim. The CCC believes the event attendance is a mandate made by Oshoffa following his declaration that God had chosen Imeko as the New Jerusalem for the fold.

Architecture 
The temples of worship always face east. An altar stand has seven candle holders that represent the seven spirits of Jehovah as represented in Revelation 4:5. The church auditorium also has different rows for male and female seats. On days that services are observed during the week, such as the Wednesday and the Friday services, another altar is made which has three, rather than seven, candles.

Demographics and reception
In 2001, it was the second largest church in Benin by the number of its practitioners with nearly half a million followers.

In France, the church is suspected by two anti-cults associations, ADFI and CCMM, of "cultic deviances" and of having committed acts of violence involving the death of a fifteen-year-old minor.

Bibliography
  Pierre Ndjom, Lumière sur l'Eglise du Christianisme Céleste, Paris (France), 2016, 283 p. 
  Apollinaire Adetonah, Lumière sur le Christianisme Céleste, 1972, 85 p.
  Christine Henry, Pierre-Joseph Laurent and André Mary, « Du vin nouveau dans de vieilles outres : parcours d'un dissident du Christianisme Céleste (Bénin) », in Social Compass, 2001, vol. 48, no 3, pp. 353–68
  Christine Henry, La force des anges : rites, hiérarchie et divination dans le Christianisme Céleste, Bénin, Brepols, Turnhout (Belgique), 2008, 280 p.
  Codjo Hébert Johnson, Le syncrétisme religieux dans le golfe du Bénin : le cas du 'Christianisme céleste' , Université Panthéon-Sorbonne, Paris, 1974, 139 p.
  Joël Noret, « La place des morts dans le christianisme céleste », in Social compass, 2003, vol. 50, no 4, pp. 493–510
  Laurent Omonto Ayo Gérémy Ogouby, « L'Église du christianisme céleste », in Les religions dans l'espace public au Bénin: vodoun, christianisme, islam, L'Harmattan, Paris, 2008, pp. 46–48
  R. Saint-Germain, « Les chrétiens célestes, description d'une Église indépendante africaine: Questions d'éthique en sciences des religions », in Religiologiques (Montréal), 1996, vol. 13, pp. 169–94
  Codjo Sodokin, Les 'syncrétismes' religieux contemporains et la société béninoise: Le cas du christianisme céleste, Université Lumière, Lyon, 1984, 306 p.
  Albert de Surgy, L'Église du Christianisme Céleste: Un exemple d'Église prophétique au Bénin, Karthala editions, 2001, 332 p.
  Claude Wauthier, « L'Église du christianisme céleste », in Sectes et prophètes d'Afrique noire, Seuil, Paris, 2007, chapter XV, p. 227 and f.
 Afeosemime U. Adogame, Celestial Church of Christ: the politics of cultural identity in a West African prophetic-charismatic movement, P. Lang, Francfort-sur-le-Main, New York, P. Lang, 1999, 251 p.
(in English) Edith Oshoffa, The Enigmatic spiritual leader of our time S.B.J. Oshoffa: Celestial Church of Christ Beulah Parish, 1st Edition April 2014, Edith Oshoffa,

Filmography
  Regard sur le christianisme céleste, documentary film produced by Albert de Surgy, CNRS Audiovisuel, Meudon, 1995, 40' (VHS)

References

External links

Celestial hymns, artists and reference documents
website of Celestial Church of Christ, CCC London
Homepage of Celestial Church USA 
Website of the Official headquarters in Nigeria
Constitution CCC
The Spiritual Structural Foundation of CCC
Scriptural Foundations of the Celestial Church Mode of Worship
Amazing Facts About Some of Most Inspirational Spiritual Hymns in CCC
Marburg Journal of Religion article
 Brief mention

1947 establishments in French Dahomey
African initiated churches
Christian denominations established in the 20th century
Christian organizations established in 1947
Christian denominations in Benin
Christian new religious movements